Robert Charles (1865–1900) was an African American whose arrest led to the Robert Charles riots.

Robert Charles may also refer to:
Sir Bob Charles (golfer) (born 1936), New Zealand professional golfer
Bob Charles (politician) (1936–2016), Australian Liberal politician
Bob Charles Beers, American ice hockey player
Bobby Charles (1938–2010), singer/songwriter
Robert Charles (scholar) (1855–1931), Irish priest, biblical scholar and theologian
Robert B. Charles, United States Department of State official
Robert H. Charles (1913–2000)

Bob Charles (footballer) (1941–2014), professional football goalkeeper with Southampton FC in the 1960s

Characters 
Bob Charles (Fair City)